Kamal Bahamdan (born 12 February 1970) is a Saudi Arabian businessman and equestrian.

Early life
Kamal was born in Riyadh, after attending high school he graduated in 1994 from Boston University with a Bachelor of Science in Manufacturing Engineering.

Career and controversies
He is CEO and vice-chairman of the Bahamdan Group, established in the 1940s by his grandfather Salem Bahamdan in Makkah. It was incorporated in the 1950s in Riyadh by his father Abdullah Bahamdan the former MD and Chairman of the National Commercial Bank (NCB) of Saudi Arabia, which was at the time the Arab world's largest bank. Since foundation, the Group has made more than 250 investments in a range of markets and sectors across the Middle East, Europe, Asia and the United States. With his father now acting as chairman, under Kamal's management the Group expanded its investment operations, and presently has investments in over 130 companies employing over 8,000 people.

In 2009, Bahamdan, with the backing of the Bahamdan Group, formed the global principal investment firm Safanad

In March 2014, Safanad and Formation Capital sold a portfolio of 43 senior housing facilities and 37 skilled nursing facilities to NorthStar Realty for $1.05Bn.

In June 2014, Safanad and Ron Packard, education company Stride, Inc. founder and former CEO, announced the launch of a new education company, Pansophic Learning. Upon establishment, the company immediately acquired from K12 Inc. several assets including licenses to curriculum and technology, an international brick and mortar private school, a higher education platform business and the K12 business in the Middle East.
P
Bahamdan is also co-founder of the Al-Khabeer Merchant Finance Corporation (est.2007), and was Managing Partner and co-founder of Washington DC-based international investment firm BV Group (est. 1995). In 2012 he was awarded the King Abdulaziz Order of Merit First Class and in 2006 was named a Forum of Young Global Leaders in business by the Forum of Young Global Leaders, an affiliate organisation of the World Economic Forum.

Safanad is also the owner of HC-One, an elderly care home provider working in the UK. A BBC Panorama investigation highlighted how private-equity investors such as Kamal Bahamdan negatively impact certain sectors of the economy, by diverting company money to finance expensive debts introduced by the investor. Companies part of HC-One's corporate structure have faced administration due to the high cost of servicing its debt, ultimately funnelling money obtained through considerable care fees placed on vulnerable residents towards Safanad and Kamal Bahamdan, while providing poor quality of care.

Show jumping

Bahamdan is also a sports champion.

Riding since the age of seven, he took further riding lessons in the United Kingdom every summer, and then started competing in local equestrian events, often against compatriots Ramzy Al-Duhami and Khaled Al-Eid. Whilst studying then working in finance in the United States he competed on the East Coast circuit, where he came to the attention of Ziyad Abduljawad, now managing director of Saudi Equestrian. In 2004, he moved his riding base to Valkenswaard, Netherlands, making his international competition debut in the same year, but competing only on a part-time basis.

After winning the team and individual gold at the 2004 Pan Arab Games, he won the team gold and individual silver medal at the 2011 Pan Arab Games in Doha. Having competed at the Summer Olympics in 1996, 2000, 2004, 2008, after the 2010 FEI World Equestrian Games in Kentucky, he decided to concentrate full-time in the lead-up to the 2012 Summer Olympics in London, England, working with Jan Tops. With the Saudi team coached by Stanny Van Paesschen, the team won bronze and Bahamdan came fourth in the individual event. He has since entered the Longines-sponsored Global Champions Tour, winning the 2013 Riyadh Grand Prix with Noblesse des Tess.

In 2013 he was appointed to the International Federation for Equestrian Sports (FEI) Jumping committee, for an initial four-year period. In February 2014 he was named runner up in the Arriyadiyah Awards for Sports Excellence, presented by Prince Nawaf bin Faisal.

References

External links

Bio at BusinessWeek
Bio at Saudi Equestrian 

1970 births
Living people
Asian Games medalists in equestrian
Boston University College of Engineering alumni
Equestrians at the 1996 Summer Olympics
Equestrians at the 2000 Summer Olympics
Equestrians at the 2004 Summer Olympics
Equestrians at the 2006 Asian Games
Equestrians at the 2008 Summer Olympics
Equestrians at the 2012 Summer Olympics
Medalists at the 2012 Summer Olympics
Olympic bronze medalists for Saudi Arabia
Olympic equestrians of Saudi Arabia
Olympic medalists in equestrian
Sportspeople from Riyadh
Saudi Arabian chief executives
Saudi Arabian investment bankers
Saudi Arabian male equestrians
Asian Games gold medalists for Saudi Arabia
Medalists at the 2006 Asian Games